The Africa Liberal Network (ALN) is an organization composed of 47 political parties from 29 countries in Africa. It is an associated organisation of Liberal International, the political family to which liberal democratic parties belong. The ALN serves to promote liberal objectives and principles throughout the continent.

Parties involved in the ALN agree to a policy stating that they: exist to ensure the freedom and dignity of all people through; establishing political and civil rights, ensuring basic freedoms, the rule of law, democratic government based on free and fair elections with peaceful transition, ensuring religious, gender, and minority rights, fighting corruption, and establishing free market economies.

Development
The network developed from what was originally the Organisation of African Liberal Parties and was established during an initial meeting of parties in Mombasa, Kenya, in July 2001. It was formally launched at a subsequent meeting in Johannesburg, South Africa, in June 2003. This meeting adopted the Johannesburg Declaration, committing the parties to core liberal democratic principles. The network is now run from the Democratic Alliance headquarters in Cape Town, South Africa. The Westminster Foundation for Democracy primarily supports the ALN, and since its inception it has maintained a mutually beneficial relationship with other partners. To ensure sustainability the ALN is seeking to diversity and broaden its support and partnership base to include other institutions.

Objectives
The Africa Liberal Network's objectives are:
 Facilitate the development and growth of Liberal Democratic parties.
 Encourage solidarity among member parties with the aim of assisting them to achieve power through democratic means.
 Establish an alliance of like-minded Liberal Democratic parties in Africa for sharing information and experiences.

Projects and activities
The ALN's projects focus on: coordination and leadership meetings; election/campaign support; policy development; party organisation and development; political education, civic awareness, voter education and registration; joint policy positions; training seminars, workshops; gender and youth mainstreaming; information and Skills exchange through visits, website, bulletin, publications, research.

Members
Organization of African Liberal Youth-Liberals Energizing African Democracy OALY-LEAD

Botswana Movement for Democracy BMD

Alliance for Democracy and Federation-African Democratic Rally ADF-RDA
Union for Progress and Reform UPC

 ADR

Alliance Nationale pour les Comores ANC

National Alliance of Democrats for Reconstruction ANADER
 ARC
 PNR
Peuple au Service de la Nation PSN
Union pour la Majorité Républicain UMR

 Republic of Congo
Union des Démocrates Humanistes UDH-Yuki

Ethiopian Democratic Party EDP

 Ghana
Liberal Party of Ghana LPG
Progressive People's Party PPP

Parti de l'Unité et du Libéralisme Social PULS
Rassemblement pour la République RPR (application under review)
Union of Democratic Forces of Guinea UFDG
Union of Republican Forces UFR

Rally of the Republicans RDR

People's Liberal Party PLP
Orange Democratic Movement ODM

Arche de la Nation ADN
Movement for the Progress of Madagascar MFM

Forum for Democratic Devolution FDD

Parti citoyen pour le renouveau PCR
Party for Economic Development and Solidarity PDES
Union for the Republic and Democracy URD

Rassemblement pour la Mauritanie RPM-Temam

Popular Movement MP
Constitutional Union UC

Mouvement pour la renaissance du Niger MRN-NIYYA

Senegalese Democratic Party PDS
Parti pour la Liberté et la Citoyenneté / Défar Jikoyi PLC/DJ
Rewmi

Seychelles National Party SNP

People's Movement for Democratic Change PMDC
 

CAHDİ Party

Democratic Alliance DA

South Sudan Liberal Youth Forum SSLYF

Liberal Party of Sudan LPS
Sudan of the Future SoF
Truth Federal Party TFP

 Swaziland
African United Democratic Party AUDP

Civic United Front CUF

Parti des Togolais PDT

People's Alliance for Change PAC
United Party for National Development UPND

References

External links
Africa Liberal Network

2001 establishments in Africa
International liberal organizations
Liberalism in Africa
Organisations based in Cape Town
Pan-African organizations
Political party alliances in Africa
Politics of Africa